Manohar Singh Gill (born 14 June 1936), famous as M. S. Gill is a retired Indian bureaucrat, politician, and writer. As a bureaucrat, he served as a member of the Indian Administrative Service from 1958 until his retirement in 2001 as the Chief Election Commissioner of India. Upon his retirement, he joined the Indian National Congress and was elected to the Rajya Sabha from Punjab in 2004 and served as a member of the upper house until his retirement upon completion of his two six-year terms in 2016. He also served as the Minister of Youth Affairs and Sports from 2008 till 2011 and as the Minister of Statistics and Programme Implementation in 2011.

Early life and career
Gill attended St. George's College in Mussoorie, India. In 1958, he joined the Indian Administrative Services and served in administration at various places in different capacities in the undivided Punjab until 1966 when Punjab was trifurcated to carve out separate states of Himachal Pradesh and Haryana. His various postings included as Sub-Divisional Magistrate in Mahendragarh, now in Haryana, Deputy Commissioner of the then Lahaul-Spiti district, now in Himachal Pradesh. He also served as the Agriculture Secretary of Punjab from 1985-1987 under Captain Amarinder Singh who was then the Agriculture Minister of Punjab.

Gill served as the Chief Election Commissioner of India from 1996 to 2001 succeeding T. N. Seshan. His major achievement was introduction of Electronic Voting machines which curbed malpractices to a large extent. He was awarded the Padma Vibhushan for his work in this post. At the 300 year anniversary of the Khalsa, he was awarded the "Nishan-e-Khalsa".

Upon his retirement from the elite services, he joined politics with the Indian National Congress. In 2004, he was nominated by the party for the election to the Rajya Sabha from Punjab and became its member on 10 April 2004. He was re-elected in 2010 and continued to serve as its member till his retirement upon completion of his tenure on 9 April 2016. In a cabinet reshuffle held on 6 April 2008, he was inducted to the union council of ministers as Minister of State (Independent Charge) in the Ministry of Youth Affairs and Sports. 

Following the Congress party's victory in the 2009 Indian election, he was re-inducted into the council of ministers and held cabinet rank in the second term. He continued to serve as the Minister of Youth Affairs and Sports. It was during the tenure as Minister of Youth Affairs and Sports that India hosted the 2010 Commonwealth Games in New Delhi which also contributed to huge controversies including several allegations of corruption and mismanagement which later led to his removal from the ministry in a cabinet reshuffle in January 2011.

He was then appointed as the Minister of Statistics and Programme Implementation on 19 January 2011 and served until his resignation on 12 July 2011.

Books authored
In 1972, Gill authored the book Himalayan Wonder: Travels in Lahaul and Spiti, recounting stories from his days as a young IAS officer in the Lahaul-and-Spiti district, then in Punjab. Another book based on that period that he wrote is Tales from the Hills: Lahaul's Enduring Myths and Legends (2014).

Awards and recognition
  Padma Vibhushan (2000)

References

Indian National Congress politicians
Recipients of the Padma Vibhushan in civil service
Chief Election Commissioners of India
Living people
Indian Sikhs
Union ministers of state of India
Rajya Sabha members from Punjab, India
1936 births
Indian Administrative Service officers
Alumni of Queens' College, Cambridge
People related to Lahaul and Spiti district